The black-throated monitor (Varanus albigularis microstictus) is a subspecies of monitor lizard in the family Varanidae. The subspecies is native to Tanzania.

Description
It is the largest of the four subspecies of the rock monitor, V. albigularis.

Etymology
The generic name, Varanus, is derived from the Arabic word waral ورل, which is translated to English as "warn" or "warning."

The specific name, albigularis, comes from a compound of two Latin words: albus meaning "white" and gula meaning "throat".

The subspecific synonym, ionidesi, is in honor of Constantine John Philip Ionides (1901-1968), called the "Snake Man of British East Africa".

Diet
In captivity V. a. microstictus feeds mainly on whole prey, such as mice, rats, snakes, lizards, freshwater mollusks, small birds, large roaches, crustaceans, fish, and eggs. It will commonly accept cat and dog food, which is not acceptable as a staple diet due to an improper nutrient profile and high caloric content. In the wild, it will eat anything it can catch.

See also
List of largest extant lizards
White-throated monitor
Rock monitor

References

Further reading
Boettger O (1893). Katalog der Reptilien-Sammlung im Museum der Senckenbergischen Naturforschenden Gesellschaft in Frankfurt am Main. I. Teil (Rhynchocephalen, Schildkröten, Krokodile, Eidechsen, Chamäleons. Frankfurt am Main: Gebrüder Knauer. x + 140 pp. (Varanus microstictus, new species, p. 72). (in German).
Laurent RF (1964). "A New Subspecies of Varanus exanthematicus (Sauria, Varanidae)". Breviora (199): 1–5. (Varanus exanthematicus ionidesi, new subspecies).
Phillips, John ("Andy") (2004). "Varanus albigularis ". pp. 91–94. In: Pianka, Eric R.; King, Dennis R.; King, Ruth Allen (editors) (2004). Varanoid Lizards of the World. Bloomington and Indianapolis: Indiana University Press. xiii + 588 pp. .

Varanus